The 1985–86 Idaho Vandals men's basketball team represented the University of Idaho during the 1985–86 NCAA Division I men's basketball season. Members of the Big Sky Conference, the Vandals were led by third-year head coach Bill Trumbo, and played their home games on campus at the Kibbie Dome in Moscow, Idaho.

Prior to the season, the coaches picked Idaho to finish fifth in the conference, and the media had them at sixth. At the conference tournament in Reno, they met second-seed Montana in the quarterfinals and lost by eight points, their  third consecutive loss in the Big Sky quarterfinals.

In three seasons, Trumbo's teams were  overall ( in conference) and he was relieved of his duties in  succeeded by  an assistant under hall of fame head coach Don Haskins at

Postseason result

|-
!colspan=6 style=| Big Sky tournament

References

External links
Sports Reference – Idaho Vandals: 1985–86 basketball season
Gem of the Mountains: 1986 University of Idaho yearbook – 1985–86 basketball season
Idaho Argonaut – student newspaper – 1986 editions

Idaho Vandals men's basketball seasons
Idaho
Idaho
Idaho